The India women's cricket team toured Sri Lanka to play against the Sri Lanka women's cricket team in June and July 2022. The tour consisted of three Women's One Day International (WODI) and three Women's Twenty20 International (WT20I) matches. The WODI matches were part of 2022–2025 ICC Women's Championship. Both teams used the matches as preparation for the women's cricket tournament at the 2022 Commonwealth Games in Birmingham, England. Harmanpreet Kaur was named as India's new captain for the tour, after Mithali Raj announced her retirement from international cricket.

India won the opening match of the tour, with a 34-run win in the first WT20I. India won the second WT20I by five wickets, recording their 12th successive win against Sri Lanka in the format, and to win the series with a match to play. Sri Lanka won the third and final WT20I by seven wickets, with India winning the series 2–1. It was Sri Lanka's first win against India at home in a WT20I match.

India won the first WODI match by four wickets. India then won the second WODI by ten wickets to take an unassailable lead in the series. India's run chase in the match was the highest successful target that was chased by a team in WODI cricket without losing a wicket. India won the third and final WODI by 39 runs, to win the series 3–0.

Squads

WT20I series

1st WT20I

2nd WT20I

3rd WT20I

WODI series

1st WODI

2nd WODI

3rd WODI

References

External links
 Series home at ESPN Cricinfo

India 2022
Sri Lanka 2022
International cricket competitions in 2022
2022 in Indian cricket
2022 in Sri Lankan cricket
2022 in women's cricket